Sekinat Adesanya Akinpelu (born 25 July 1987) is a Nigerian sprinter who specializes in the 400 metres.

Her personal best time is 52.48 seconds, achieved during the 2006 World Junior Championships.

Achievements

External links

1987 births
Living people
Nigerian female sprinters
Yoruba sportswomen
African Games gold medalists for Nigeria
African Games medalists in athletics (track and field)
Athletes (track and field) at the 2007 All-Africa Games
21st-century Nigerian women